The Bull of Union with the Copts, also known as Cantate Domino after its incipit, was a bull promulgated by Pope Eugene IV at the Ecumenical Council of Florence on 4 February 1442. It was part of an attempt by the Catholic Church to reunite with other Christian groups including the Coptic Church of Egypt. The attempted union with the Copts failed.

The Bull of Union with the Copts denounced Christians who continued to observe the practices of circumcision, the Jewish sabbath and "other legal prescriptions as strangers to the faith of Christ" as practiced by the Copts.

Notes

External links
 Ecumenical Council of Florence 1438-1445 (archived)
 Catholic Encyclopedia (1910) - entry on Eugene IV
 Bulla Cantate Domino - The bull in Latin
 Cantate Domino - The bull in English

15th-century Oriental Orthodoxy
15th-century papal bulls
Circumcision
Documents of Pope Eugene IV